Chesterfield is a town and an unparished area  in the Borough of Chesterfield, Derbyshire, England.  The town and surrounding area contain 208 listed buildings that are recorded in the National Heritage List for England.  Of these, one is listed at Grade I, the highest of the three grades, 14 are at Grade II*, the middle grade, and the others are at Grade II, the lowest grade.  Most of the listed buildings are houses, cottages and associated structures, shops, banks and offices, public buildings, farmhouses and farm buildings.  The other listed buildings include churches, chapels and items in churchyards, public houses, former mills, a lock on the Chesterfield Canal and a bridge crossing it, lamp posts and lamp standards, a town pump, a former workhouse, former schools, a market hall, cemetery buildings, a memorial hall later used as a museum, statues, four war memorials, a cinema and ballroom, and a bandstand and a conservatory in Queen's Park.


Key

Buildings

References

Citations

Sources

{{NHLE |num= 1088287|desc= Holywell House (now part of Chesterfield and North Derbyshire Royal Hospital), Chesterfield|access-date= 8 May 2022|mode=cs2|fewer-links=yes

 

Lists of listed buildings in Derbyshire
Listed